Hugh IV (died 25 March 1051) was Count of Maine from 1036 to  1051.

Life
Hugh was the son of Herbert I, Count of Maine, one of the Hugonides. He was a minor on the death of his father (1036) so was born between 1018 and 1022. Herbert Baco, his great-uncle and a supporter of the Angevins, acted as regent.

The Bishop of Le Mans, Gervais de Château-du-Loir, was a partisan of the opposing Blois family. The bishop and regent clashed, with the outcome being the expulsion of Herbert by means of a popular council. Gervais then proclaimed Hugh to have reached his majority, and arranged a marriage for him, with Berthe de Blois. 

Herbert, unlike his predecessors, followed the advice of his bishop. Gervais, unlike his uncle who he succeeded, Avesgaud de Bellême (who was an adherent of the Counts of Anjou) was allied to the Counts of Blois. Hugh, no doubt in support of his bishop, engaged in a number of wars with Geoffrey Martel, Count of Anjou, in the Loir valley. Shortly after Hugh's death, 25 March 1051, Gervais sought refuge in Normandy after being driven out of Maine. Gervais' success in strengthening the Bishopric of Le Mans served to downgrade the countship of Maine, which led to the county being absorbed into the domains of Anjou and Normandy.

Family
Hugh married c. 1046 Bertha of Blois, who was the widow of Alan III, Duke of Brittany, and daughter of Odo II, Count of Blois and Ermengarde of Auvergne.

Their children were:
Herbert II, Count of Maine († 1062).
 Marguerite (c. 1045 † 1063), betrothed to Robert Curthose.

Notes

References

Sources

1051 deaths
Counts of Maine
Year of birth unknown